Madagascarophis lolo is a species of snakes known for being endemic to the African area of Madagascar. The creature is colloquially referred to as the ghost snake due to its strikingly pale body shade. It was initially found inside of a lime rock formation in 2016.

Description 

Madagascarophis lolo can be identified from other species in its genus by its gray, overall body color with black vertebral stripe and dorsal, alternating lighter gray splotches. It has 25 midbody scale rows, 189 ventral scales and 56 divided subcaudal scales. With the exception of M. fuchsi, it differs from all other Madagascarophis species by having extended contact of posterior infralabial scales. M. lolo can be distinguished from M. fuchsi by its slightly lower number of infralabial scales, with M. lolo having around 10 infralabial scales to the approximately 12–13 infralabial scales of M. fuchsi.

Behavior 
Alike other species of Madagascarophis, M. lolo is nocturnal.

Habitat 

Their habitat is variable, as they are terrestrial and semi-arboreal, but mainly are found on karst rock formations. Researchers propose that the rarity of M. lolo sightings could be due to their rough terrain habitat, as the karst rock formations are difficult to navigate, especially in the night, when M. lolo would be active.

Distribution 
Madagascarophis lolo is probably endemic to karst areas of Analamerana and Ankarana of Madagascar.

Etymology 
Madagascarophis lolo gets its specific name lolo from the Malagasy word for "ghost". There are two reasons for this name, namely, the pale gray color of the ghost snake, and the elusiveness of the species relative to other species in an area of Ankarana that is relatively well explored.

See also 

 Wildlife of Madagascar

References 

Pseudoxyrhophiidae
Endemic fauna of Madagascar
Reptiles of Madagascar
Reptiles described in 2016